Will Burns (born 24 June 1990 in Weston-Super-Mare) is a British racing driver, currently competing in the British GT series with Century Motorsports.

Racing career

Early career

Burns began his car racing career in 2011 running in the Ginetta Challenge. He spent three seasons in the series finishing the 2013 season as the runner-up. Near the end of the 2013 season, he joined the BTCC supporting Ginetta GT Supercup running in the secondary G50 class for seven races with Academy Motorsport.

Burns moved up to the primary class in the Ginetta GT Supercup for 2014 remaining with Academy Motorsport, he completed his first full season 7th in points. The following season he moved to HHC Motorsport and finished 5th. In 2016 he moved to Douglas Motorsport where he finally took his first wins in the series and narrowly lost the championship to Tom Wrigley.

British Touring Car Championship

For the 2017 season, Burns was signed by Tony Gilham Racing to compete in the British Touring Car Championship. His teammates were Jake Hill and Michael Epps.

British GT Championship 
For 2018, Burns signed for the Yorkshire based racing team HHC Motorsport, alongside Mike Newbould. They would be competing in a Ginetta G55 GT4.

Racing record

Complete British Touring Car Championship results
(key) (Races in bold indicate pole position – 1 point awarded just in first race; races in italics indicate fastest lap – 1 point awarded all races; * signifies that driver led race for at least one lap – 1 point given all races)

Complete British GT Championship results
(key) (Races in bold indicate pole position) (Races in italics indicate fastest lap)

References

English racing drivers
British Touring Car Championship drivers
1990 births
Living people
People from Weston-super-Mare
British GT Championship drivers
Ginetta GT4 Supercup drivers
GT4 European Series drivers